Kaleb Nobles is an American football coach who is the head football coach at West Florida.

Playing career
Nobles grew up Fitzgerald, Georgia and attended Fitzgerald High School College and Career Academy. As a senior, he completed 107-of-162 pass attempts for 1,481 yards and 15 touchdowns with four interceptions.

Nobles initially played college football at Valdosta State. He played in ten games with two starts as a freshman and passed for 967 yards and 12 touchdowns. As a sophomore Nobles completed 103-of-164 pass attempts for 1,042 yards and seven touchdowns. He competed for the starting quarterback job entering his junior season, but suffered a groin injury in training camp. Nobles ultimately redshirted the season and transferred to West Florida, which had just established its football program. He was named the starting quarterback for the Argonauts inaugural season. Nobles passed for 3,050 yards with 28 touchdowns and 18 interceptions in 11 games played in his final season.

Coaching career
Nobles began his coaching career as the quarterbacks coach at West Florida after graduating. He was promoted to co-offensive coordinator entering the 2019 season. West Florida won the 2019 Division II National Championship. Nobles was hired in an off-field role as the director of offensive player development at Clemson in 2021.

Nobles was hired as the head coach at West Florida on December 12, 2022.

Head coaching record

References

External links
 West Florida coach profile
 West Florida player profile
 Valdosta State player profile

Year of birth missing (living people)
Living people
American football quarterbacks
Clemson Tigers football coaches
Valdosta State Blazers football players
West Florida Argonauts football coaches
West Florida Argonauts football players
People from Fitzgerald, Georgia
Players of American football from Georgia (U.S. state)
Coaches of American football from Georgia (U.S. state)